Jack Binder is an American film producer (The Upside of Anger, First Reformed, Reign Over Me) and television producer (The Mind of the Married Man, HBO) and second unit director active since 1985. With older brother Mike Binder, a writer, actor and director. Binder works with the Major Hollywood Studios and independent film companies. Based in Los Angeles and London Binder produces worldwide and is involved in film finance. He formed Michigan Film Production to provide information on the Michigan Film Incentives program, which he helped to enable  and created FilmBudget.com, a site that creates a feature film budget & film finance plans for financing and movie production. Binder's production company is Greentrees Films. His family is of Russian-Jewish descent.

Filmography
First Reformed (2018) producer
Tomorrow (2016) executive producer (w/ Martin Scorsese)
The Domino Effect (2012) producer
Reign Over Me (2007) producer
Man About Town (2007) producer, second unit director, unit production manager
The Upside of Anger (2005) producer, unit production manager, second unit director
The Mind of the Married Man (HBO series 2001–2002) producer, second unit director, unit production manager
The Search for John Gissing (2002) producer, unit production manager, second unit director
Londinium (2001) producer, second unit director, unit production manager
The Sex Monster (2000) producer, unit production manager, second unit director
Blankman (1994) co-producer, second unit director
Indian Summer (1993) co-producer
Crossing the Bridge (1992) co-producer

Notes

References
Film Budget (official site)

External links

Living people
American film producers
American television producers
Year of birth missing (living people)
Place of birth missing (living people)